The Kovenhoven House or Corneles Couwenhoven House is located in Holmdel Township, Monmouth County, New Jersey, United States. The house was built in 1699 and was added to the National Register of Historic Places on April 26, 1974.

See also
National Register of Historic Places listings in Monmouth County, New Jersey

References

Holmdel Township, New Jersey
Houses completed in 1700
Houses in Monmouth County, New Jersey
Houses on the National Register of Historic Places in New Jersey
National Register of Historic Places in Monmouth County, New Jersey
New Jersey Register of Historic Places
1700 establishments in New Jersey